Uno Platform is an open source cross-platform graphical user interface that allows WinUI and Universal Windows Platform (UWP) - based code to run on iOS, macOS, Linux, Android, and WebAssembly. Uno Platform is released under the Apache 2.0 license.

Applications can be built by using the UWP tools in Visual Studio on Windows, including XAML and C# Edit and Continue, and run on iOS, Android or in WebAssembly in a web browser. A plug in for Microsoft Visual Studio is available from Microsoft's Visual Studio Marketplace. The community surrounding Uno Platform open source project comes together at its annual conference UnoConf.

See also 
 WebAssembly
 Blazor
 .NET Multi-platform App UI (.NET MAUI)
 Windows App SDK

References

Further reading 
 The Register: WinUI and WinRT: Official modern Windows API now universal thanks to WebAssembly
 InfoWorld: Put Windows apps on the web with Uno
 Channel9: Uno Platform Part 1

External links 
 Uno Platform

Mobile software development
Mobile software programming tools
Software development by platforms
Software using the Apache license
Web development software